Mallosia theresae is a species of beetle in the family Cerambycidae. It was described by Maurice Pic in 1900. It is endemic to Turkey.

Mallosia theresae measure  in length.

References

Saperdini
Beetles of Asia
Endemic fauna of Turkey
Beetles described in 1900
Taxa named by Maurice Pic